The Barreto River is a river in the state of Pará, Brazil.
The river enters the Atlantic Ocean in the municipality of São João da Ponta, Pará.

Course

The Barreto River divides the São João da Ponta Extractive Reserve to the east from the Mocapajuba Marine Extractive Reserve to the west.
It flows past the village of São Caetano de Odivelas on its left (west) bank.

Environment

The mouth of Rio Barreto mostly flows through mud flats.
In this region there is a relatively low population of about 23 people per square kilometer. 
The region has a monsoon climate. 
Rainfall averages  annually.

See also
List of rivers of Pará

References

Sources

Rivers of Pará
Tributaries of the Amazon River